The Power of the Dog is a 2005 crime/thriller novel by American writer Don Winslow, based on the DEA's involvement with the War on Drugs. The book was published after six years of writing and research by the author.

Plot summary
Winslow's novel describes three decades of the United States' war on drugs by following several main characters: The DEA agent Art Keller; Adán Barrera, who controls large parts of the drug trade from Mexico to the United States of America; the prostitute Nora Hayden; and Sean Callan, a gangster from the streets of New York. Agent Keller becomes obsessed with the Barrera family after they torture and kill a DEA agent in Mexico. Trying to avenge his colleague, Keller discovers massive involvement of the US and the Mexican governments in drug trade operations. The CIA prevents him from taking revenge on the drug cartels to combat left-wing activists in Latin America.

Winslow's novel exposes the brutality of the war of drugs with graphic scenes of torture and massacres. It also navigates through the inner workings of the drug trade and how different organizations collaborate to achieve their respective goals, from the Mexican drug cartels to the Vatican.

Characters
 Arthur "Art" "Arturo" Keller: DEA agent, participant in the Operation Condor, obsessed with hunting down the Barreras, and other people responsible for killing his friend. Husband to Althea. Father of two children.
 Adán Barrera: Nephew of Don Miguel Angel Barrera, brother of Raúl. Drug trafficker. Nicknamed Lord of the Skies. Based on Benjamín Arellano Félix, although Amado Carrillo Fuentes is "The Lord of the Skies." Barrera is also partly based on Joaquin "El Chapo" Guzman.
 Nora Hayden: Prostitute. Friend of Juan Parada. In love with Sean. Professional lover of Adán and Jimmy Piccone.
 Sean Callan: Irish mobster and hitman for the Italian mafia.
 Don Miguel Angel "Tío" Barrera: El Patrón, head of the drug trafficking organization. Uncle of Adán and Raúl. Based on Miguel Ángel Félix Gallardo.
 Juan Ocampo Parada: Cardinal, priest of the Barrera family. Nora's friend. Based on Cardinal Juan Jesus Posadas Ocampo.
 Güero Méndez: Drug trafficker, first an ally, then an enemy of the Barrera family. Husband of Pilar and father of her children. Based on Héctor "Güero" Palma Salazar.
 Sal Scachi: Former Colonel of the United States Army, now member of the Cimino crime family.
 Jimmy Picone: Member of the Cimino crime family, acquaintance of Sean Callan and Sal Scachi.
 Fabián "El Tiburon" Martinez: Main hitman of Raúl Barrera. Based on David Barron Corona.
 Raúl Barrera: Younger brother of Adán, co-leader of the Barrera cartel. Based on Ramón Arellano Félix.
 Gloria Barrera: Daughter of Adán and Lucia.
 O-Bop: Friend of Sean Callan, Irish mobster.
 Ramos: Friend of Arthur, member of the Mexican Police.
 Ernie Hidalgo: Friend of Art Keller, member of the DEA.  Based on Enrique "Kiki" Camarena.
 Cimino crime family: Based on the Gambino crime family.

Allusions to actual history, geography and current science
The Power of the Dog starts in 1975 and follows the DEA's War on Drugs and various aspects of Operation Condor, with the CIA involvement in Contra cocaine trafficking being central to the book's plot. It also includes the 1985 Mexico City earthquake and its far-reaching consequences for Mexico, and portrays the Mexican presidential candidate Luis Donaldo Colosio's murder in Tijuana on March 23, 1994. Aspects and some of the resolutions of the Cristero War are also mentioned.

Film adaptation
In 2015, 20th Century Fox paid $6 million for the film rights to both The Power of the Dog and its sequel, The Cartel, with Ridley Scott producing.

Sequel
In 2015, the first sequel The Cartel, was published. It follows Keller from 2004 to 2014 as he continues to track down Barrera after he escapes from prison. In 2019, the final book in the three-part series, The Border, was published. It follows Keller as head of the DEA.

References

External links
 Don Winslow's website

2005 American novels
American thriller novels
Novels about organized crime
Alfred A. Knopf books
Novels set in Mexico
Novels by Don Winslow
Works about Mexican drug cartels